Minshall (also known as Minchel or Odd) is an unincorporated community in Raccoon Township, Parke County, in the U.S. state of Indiana.

History
A post office called Odd was established in 1884, and remained in operation until 1901. The name Minshall is for local deposits Minshall coal.

Geography

References

Unincorporated communities in Indiana
Unincorporated communities in Parke County, Indiana